Anaccra is a genus of moths belonging to the subfamily Tortricinae of the family Tortricidae.

Species
Anaccra camerunica (Razowski, 1966)
Anaccra limitana (Razowski, 1966)

See also
List of Tortricidae genera

References

 , 2005: World Catalogue of Insects vol. 5 Tortricidae.

External links
tortricidae.com

Tortricini
Tortricidae genera
Taxa named by Józef Razowski